The nouns of the German language have several properties, some unique. As in many related Indo-European languages, German nouns possess a grammatical gender; the three genders are masculine, feminine, and neuter. Words for objects without obvious masculine or feminine characteristics like 'bridge' or 'rock' can be masculine or feminine. German nouns are declined (change form) depending on their grammatical case (their function in a sentence) and whether they are singular or plural. German has four cases: nominative, accusative, dative and genitive.

German is unusual among languages using the Latin alphabet in that all nouns are capitalized (for example, "the book" is always written as "das Buch"). Other High German languages, such as Luxembourgish, also capitalize both proper and common nouns. Only a handful of other languages capitalize their nouns, mainly regional languages with orthographic conventions inspired by German, such as Low German and Saterland Frisian. Under the influence of German, the Scandinavian languages formerly capitalized their nouns; Danish retained the habit until 1948.

Noun compounds are written together with no spacing (for example, the German word for "spy satellite" is "Spionagesatellit"). Plurals are normally formed by adding -e, -en, -er (or nothing) to the noun, and sometimes a vowel is also changed (the so-called umlaut). Moreover, recent loanwords from French and English often keep the -s plural ending.

Declension for case 

N-nouns: A masculine or neuter noun with genitive singular and nominative plural ending in -(e)n is called an n-noun or weak noun. Sometimes these terms are extended to feminine nouns with genitive singular - and nominative plural -en.

For the four cases, nominative, accusative, dative and genitive, the main forms of declension are:

For singular nouns:

I: Feminine nouns usually have the same form in all four cases.
nom. , acc. , dat. , gen. 
Exceptions are:
 Old declensions like  with genitive and dative singular  (in older usage)
 Words derived from Latin with nominative singular in -a and genitive singular  (in older usage)
 The words  which have forms like , but also .

II: Personal names, all neuter and most masculine nouns have genitive case -(e)s endings: normally -es if one syllable long, -s if more. Traditionally the nouns in this group also add -e in the dative case, but this is now often ignored.  
nom. , acc. , dat. , gen. 
nom. , acc. , dat. , gen. .

III: Masculine and neuter n-nouns take -(e)n for genitive, dative and accusative: this is used for masculine nouns ending with -e denoting people and animals, masculine nouns ending with  mostly denoting people, and a few others, mostly animate nouns.
a) nom. , acc. , dat. , gen. 
b) nom. , acc. , dat. , gen. .

IV: A few masculine nouns take -(e)n for accusative and dative, and -(e)ns for genitive.
a) nom. , acc. , dat. , gen. 
b) nom. , acc. , dat. , gen. .

For plural nouns:
V: In the dative case, all nouns which do not already have an -n or -s ending add -n.
a) nom. , acc. , dat. , gen. 
b) nom. , acc. , dat. , gen.

General rules of declension 
 Given the nominative singular, genitive singular, and nominative plural of a noun, it is possible to determine its declension.
 Note that for most feminine nouns, all singular forms are identical. This means that since n-nouns in general have all plural forms identical, all feminine n-nouns are effectively indeclinable.
 The dative plural of all nouns ends in -n if such an ending does not already exist, except that of nouns that form the plural with -s, which are usually loan words.
 Most nouns do not take declensions in the accusative or singular dative cases.  A class of masculine nouns, called "weak nouns," takes the ending -n or -en in all cases except the nominative.

Such forms are not commonly found in modern prose texts, except in fixed expressions (such as : "to be able") and for certain words (e.g.  or ) which are, however, quite numerous; in these cases, omitting the -e would be similarly unusual. This ending is also still used semi-productively in poetry and music, mostly for the purposes of meter and rhyme.

Nevertheless, in the genitive, the ending -es is used … 
 necessarily if the word ends with a sibilant
 usually by monosyllabic words 
 commonly if it ends on the letter d
Only words of more syllables usually add a simple -s 

In colloquial usage, moreover, singular inflection of weak masculine nouns may be limited to those ending in -e  Other nouns of this class are sometimes not inflected. Thus one might occasionally hear  instead of the more formal .

Declension classes

Irregular declensions 

 * vernacularly: dem Herz

Many foreign nouns have irregular plurals, for example:

Orthography
All German nouns are capitalized. German is the only major language to capitalize its nouns. This was also done in the Danish language until 1948 and sometimes in (New) Latin, while Early Modern English showed tendencies towards noun capitalization.

Capitalization is not restricted to nouns. Other words are often capitalized when they are nominalized (for instance das Deutsche ‘the German language’, a nominalized adjective).

Compounds
As in other Germanic languages, German nouns can be compound in effectively unlimited numbers, 
as in Rinderkennzeichnungs- und Rindfleischetikettierungsüberwachungsaufgabenübertragungsgesetz ('Cattle Marking and Beef Labelling Supervision Duties Delegation Law', the name of an actual law passed in Mecklenburg-Vorpommern in 1999), or Donaudampfschiffahrtsgesellschaft ('Danube Steamboat Shipping Company', 1829).

Unlike English compounds, German compound nouns are always written together as a single word: "spy satellite" is thus Spionagesatellit and "mad cow disease" Rinderwahn. Compound nouns take the gender of the last component noun (the head).

In addition, there is the grammatical feature of the Fugen-"s": certain compounds introduce an "s" between the noun stems, historically marking the genitive case of the first noun (cf. Idafa), but it occurs frequently after nouns which do not actually take an "s" in their genitive cases.

In many instances, the compound is acceptable both with and without the "s", but there are many cases where the "s" is mandatory and this cannot be deduced from grammatical rules,  e.g. Hochzeitskleid = "wedding dress", Liebeslied = "love song", Abfahrtszeit = "time of departure", Arbeitsamt = "employment agency".

Occurrence of the Fugen-"s" seems to be correlated to certain suffixes (of the first stem); compounds with words in -tum, -ling, -ion, -tät, -heit, -keit, -schaft, -sicht, -ung and nominalized infinitives in -en mostly do take the "s", while feminine words not ending in -ion, -tät, -heit, -keit, -schaft, -sicht, -ung mostly do not, but there are exceptions. Use of the "s" is mostly optional in compounds in which the second element is a participle.

To reduce length or to highlight distinctions, a prefix or suffix is sometimes mentioned only once but applies to more than one compound noun. For example:
 Bildergalerien und -ausstellungen ("picture galleries and [picture] exhibitions")
 Nähe Haupt- und Busbahnhof ("near the main railway [station] and bus station")

Issues with number

As in English, some nouns (e.g. mass nouns) only have a singular form (singularia tantum); other nouns only have a plural form (pluralia tantum):
 Das All, der Durst, der Sand ("the Universe", "thirst", "sand")
 Die Kosten, die Ferien ("costs", "the holidays")

Traps abound in both directions here: common mass nouns in English
are not mass nouns in German, and vice versa:
 information – Informationen, die Information ("the piece of information"), die Informationen ("the pieces of information")
 the police are (pl.) = die Polizei ist (sg.)

Again as in English, some words change their meaning when changing their number:
Geld ("money") – Gelder ("different sources of money")
Wein ("wine") – die Weine ("different types of wine")

A few words have two different plurals with distinct meanings. For example:
Wort ("word") – Wörter (isolated words, as in "five words") - Worte (connected, meaningful words, as in "his last words")
Bau – Bauten ("buildings") – Baue ("burrows")

Some words share the singular and can only be distinguished by their gender and sometimes their plural (compare “bases” in English, which can be the plural of two distinct words, “base” and “basis”): 
 Gehalt – das Gehalt, die Gehälter ("salary") – der Gehalt, die Gehalte ("content")
 Band – das Band, die Bänder ("ribbon") – der Band, die Bände ("volume (of a book)")
 Teil – das Teil, die Teile (physical "piece" e.g. from a machine) – der Teil, die Teile (conceptual "part" e.g. from a speech)
 See – der See, die Seen ("lake") – die See ("sea", no plural form) – die See, die Seen (nautical term for "(large) wave")
 Kiefer – der Kiefer, die Kiefer ("jawbone") – die Kiefer, die Kiefern ("pine tree")

See also
 German grammar
 German verbs
 German orthography
 German pronunciation

References

Notes

Citations

External links

 German Nouns and Gender – German grammar lesson covering nouns and gender

Nouns
Nouns

de:Deutsche Deklination#Substantive